Brooks Memorial Arboretum is an arboretum located in the 10,100 acre Watoga State Park, Hillsboro, West Virginia.

The arboretum, which covers the drainage of Two Mile Run, has trails up the hollow and on both ridges surrounding it.  It contains mature yellow poplars, Ohio buckeyes, cottonwoods, and other native species.

See also 
 List of botanical gardens and arboretums in West Virginia

References

Arboreta in West Virginia
Botanical gardens in West Virginia
Protected areas of Pocahontas County, West Virginia